Batea is a municipality in the comarca of Terra Alta, Catalonia, Spain. Its population in 2006 was 2,106.

Batea produces good-quality wine that has not reached high prices in the market and is mainly used for local daily consumption in the region.

References

External links

 Municipal website
 Government data pages 

Municipalities in Terra Alta (comarca)
Populated places in Terra Alta (comarca)